Pierre Hirsch (8 November 1900 – 19 April 1942) was a French tennis player. He competed in the mixed doubles event at the 1920 Summer Olympics. He died in the Auschwitz concentration camp.

References

External links
 

1900 births
1942 deaths
French male tennis players
Olympic tennis players of France
Tennis players at the 1920 Summer Olympics
Tennis players from Paris
French people who died in Auschwitz concentration camp